The 2017 Wrexham County Borough Council election took place on 4 May 2017 to elect members of Wrexham County Borough Council in Wales.  This was on the same day as other 2017 United Kingdom local elections. The previous all-council election took place in May 2012.

Background
The Labour Party held power on the council after the 2012 election, but lost it after splitting because of an internal row. Several Labour councillors became independent, allowing the Independent group to take control in alliance with the Conservatives.

In 2017, contests took place in 44 of the 47 wards.

Results
The Independents lost three seats in comparison with their position immediately prior to the election, but remained the largest group. The Conservative group gained four seats.

|}

Ward results

* = denotes councillor elected to this ward at the 2012 elections

Acton (one seat)

Councillor Lowe was elected for the Labour Party in May 2012.

Borras Park (one seat)

Bronington (one seat)

Brymbo (one seat)

Bryn Cefn (one seat)

Barbara Roxburgh was elected for the Labour Party in May 2012.

Brynyffynnon (one seat)

Cartrefle (one seat)

Cefn (two seats)

Ceiriog Valley (one seat)

Chirk North (One seat)

Chirk South (One seat)

Coedpoeth (two seats)

Erddig (one seat)

Esclusham (one seat)

Garden Village (one seat)

Councillor Williams was elected for the Labour Party in May 2012.

Gresford East and West (one seat)

Grosvenor (one seat)

Wilson was elected for the Labour Party at the previous election in 2012.

Gwenfro (one seat)

Gwersyllt East and South (two seats)

Griffiths and McCann was elected for the Labour Party at the previous election, in 2012.

Gwersyllt North (one seat)

Gwersyllt West (one seat)

Hermitage (one seat)

Holt (one seat)

Johnstown (one seat)

Little Acton (one seat)

Llangollen Rural (one seat)

Llay (two seats)

Terry Boland was elected for the Labour Party at the previous ward election, in May 2012.

Maesydre (one seat)

Marchwiel (one seat)

Marford and Hoseley (one seat)

Minera (one seat)

New Broughton (one seat)

Offa (one seat)

Overton (one seat)

Pant (one seat)

Penycae (one seat)

Penycae and Ruabon South (one seat)

Plas Madoc (one seat)

Ponciau (two seats)

Queensway (one seat)

Rhosnesni (one seat)

Rossett (one seat)

Ruabon (one seat)

Smithfield (one seat)

Stansty (one seat)

Whitegate (one seat)

Wynnstay (one seat)

References

Wrexham
Wrexham County Borough Council elections